Walter Armstrong may refer to:

 Sir Walter Armstrong (art historian) (1850–1918), British art historian and writer
 Wally Armstrong (born 1945) American professional golfer 
 Walter Sinnott-Armstrong (born 1955), American philosopher